Piotr Buciarski (born 22 November 1975 in Warsaw, Poland) is a retired Danish pole vaulter of Polish descent.

His personal best jump is 5.75 metres, achieved in April 2002 in Fort-de-France. This is the current national record. He represented Sparta and later the University of Oregon. Buciarski is a two-time national champion (2000 and 2002) in the men's decathlon.

He's the son of former Polish pole vaulter, Wojciech Buciarski. He is married to an American javelin thrower, Rachel Yurkovich.

Competition record

References

Profile

1975 births
Living people
Danish male pole vaulters
Danish decathletes
Athletes (track and field) at the 2004 Summer Olympics
Olympic athletes of Denmark
Polish emigrants to Denmark
Athletes from Warsaw